GSAC may refer to:

College athletic conferences
 The Garden State Athletic Conference, an athletic conference affiliated within the National Junior College Athletic Association (NJCAA), located in New Jersey, Delaware and Pennsylvania.
 The Golden State Athletic Conference, an athletic conference affiliated within the National Association of Intercollegiate Athletics (NAIA), located in California and Arizona
 The Great South Athletic Conference, a defunct athletic conference affiliated within the Division III ranks of the National Collegiate Athletic Association (NCAA), located in Alabama, Georgia, Tennessee and North Carolina.